Paul M. Abbate is an American law enforcement officer who has served as the Deputy Director of the Federal Bureau of Investigation since 2021. He previously served as the Associate Deputy Director of the Federal Bureau of Investigation.

Career 
Abbate started his Federal Bureau of Investigation (FBI) career in March 1996. He was assigned to the New York City Field Office, where he worked in the Criminal Division and served as a member of the SWAT team.

Abbate has also led FBI field operations while deployed in Iraq, Afghanistan and Libya.

In 2017 after President Trump's dismissal of James Comey, Abbate was on the shortlist of officials considered for the role of FBI director.

In February 2018, Abbate was named associate deputy director of the FBI. He was succeeded by Jeffrey Sallet, after being promoted to deputy director of the FBI in February 2021.

Awards
Abbatte was named one of 22 people chosen as Security Magazines' "Most Influential People in Security 2020".

References

External links 
 

American police officers
Deputy Directors of the Federal Bureau of Investigation
Biden administration personnel
Year of birth missing (living people)
Living people
Place of birth missing (living people)